Goswami Ganesh Dutta Sanatan Dharma College (GGDSDC) is a college of Panjab University located in the North Indian city of Chandigarh. Established in 1973, the GGDSD college is spread over 16.5 acres of land. The college has been awarded A+ grade by the National Assessment and Accreditation Council (NAAC), Bangalore. GGDSD College ranked 82nd in the 2018 All India Ranking by NIRF, MHRD. The college is also recognized as 'College with Potential for Excellence' by the University Grants Commission (UGC), Delhi.

Programmes
GGDSDC offers education in the following courses:

Postgraduate degree courses
 M.Sc.
 M.A.
 M.Com.

Postgraduate Diploma Courses
 Computer applications
 Mass communication
 Marketing management
 Personal management & labour welfare
 Tourism and travel management

Undergraduate honours degree courses
 B.Com. Hons.
 B.A. Hons. in English, psychology, economics, Hindi, history, sociology and political science

Undergraduate (professional degree courses)
 B.Sc. Hons. in bio-informatics
 B.Sc. Hons. in bio-technology
 B.C.A.
 B.B.A.

Undergraduate (general) degree courses
 B.A.
 B.Com.
 B.Sc. (non-medical)
 B.Sc. (medical)

Undergraduate degree with (vocational elective) subjects
 B.A. with functional English tour
 B.A. with advertising sales promotion and sales management
 B.A. / B.Sc. with information technology
 B.A. / B.Sc. with computer applications
 B.Sc. with biochemistry
 B.Sc. with biotechnology
 B.Sc. with industrial chemistry
 B.Sc. with industrial micro-biology
 B.A. with psychology

Basketball
Sahaij Sekhon, national team player for India has been a member of the College's basketball team.

References

 http://ggdsd.ac.in/
 http://dcdc.puchd.ac.in/affiliateColleges.aspx

External links

Universities and colleges in Chandigarh
Educational institutions established in 1973
1973 establishments in Chandigarh